Zigor Goikuria Garmendia (born 16 June 1979), known simply as Zigor, is a Spanish footballer who plays for CD Padura as a goalkeeper.

Football career
Zigor was born in Arrigorriaga, Biscay. His career was spent almost exclusively in Segunda División B, where he represented SD Lemona, Écija Balompié, SD Eibar and SD Amorebieta.

In 2008–09, whilst with the third club, Zigor was first-choice (34 out of 42 league games) in Segunda División, but the Basques suffered relegation after ranking in 21st position. On 8 November 2008, he collided with Real Sociedad player Iñigo Díaz de Cerio during a league match, with the striker going on to miss the rest of the season after fracturing the tibia and fibula in his right leg.

References

External links

1979 births
Living people
People from Arrigorriaga
Spanish footballers
Footballers from the Basque Country (autonomous community)
Association football goalkeepers
Segunda División players
Segunda División B players
Tercera División players
SD Amorebieta footballers
SD Lemona footballers
Écija Balompié players
SD Eibar footballers
Sportspeople from Biscay